Justin Whitlock Dart Sr. (August 17, 1907 – January 26, 1984) was an American businessman, considered the "boy wonder" of the drug store industry. In college Dart had played football for Northwestern University.

Biography 

He was born on August 17, 1907. After marrying Ruth Walgreen, Dart became an executive with his father-in-law's (Charles Walgreen) company, the Walgreens Drugstore chain. At Walgreens, he introduced the concept of placing the pharmacy counter at the back of the drug store, which not only provided privacy for medical concerns, but forced patrons to walk past many items for possible purchase.

Dart divorced his first wife, Ruth Walgreen, and left the Walgreen company shortly after. In 1943, Dart took control of the Boston-based United Drug Company. The chain operated under the Liggett, Owl, Sonta, and Rexall brands. Soon, Dart rebranded the stores under the Rexall name. After 35 years, Dart sold his stake in Rexall in 1978. Not long afterwards, he said "I would like my retirement and death to be simultaneous." During these years, Dart had acquired stakes in Avon, West Bend Housewares, Duracell, Ralph Wilson Plastics, Archer Glass and Hobart, which were collectively known as Dart Industries.

In 1980, Dart sold his company to Kraft Industries. Although Dart Industries never owned Avon, it was the former parent company to Tupperware Home Parties. Dart Industries eventually merged with Kraft Foods.

Death
Dart died from congestive heart failure in 1984, aged 76.

Presidential Medal of Freedom
Dart received the Presidential Medal of Freedom posthumously in 1987.

Family

Dart and his second wife, former actress Jane Bryan (1918–2009), were married on New Year's Eve in 1939, and remained married until his death in 1984. The couple had three children. Dart and Bryan were staunch Republicans and helped convince their close friend, former California Governor Ronald Reagan, to run for the presidency of the United States in 1980.

His son by his first marriage, Justin Whitlock Dart Jr. was an advocate for the disabled. In 1989, Dart Jr. was appointed by President George H. W. Bush to the President's Committee on Employment of People with Disabilities. Dart Jr. also helped pass the Americans with Disabilities Act of 1990; he died in 2002 of complications related to polio.

Note
Despite being in the drugstore industry, Justin Dart had no known connections to Dart Drug, founded by Herbert Haft.

Sources

References

1907 births
1984 deaths
American businesspeople in retailing
American football guards
Northwestern Wildcats football players
Sportspeople from Evanston, Illinois
20th-century American businesspeople
Presidential Medal of Freedom recipients
Illinois Republicans